The Best Of 1990–1999 is a compilation album by Yngwie Malmsteen. It was released in May 2000.

Track listing

2000 greatest hits albums
Best of '90-'99